San Juan, officially the Municipality of San Juan, is a 5th class municipality in the province of Abra, Philippines. According to the 2020 census, it has a population of 10,688 people.

A major tourist attraction is Abualan Cave, but it is not yet developed. The climate is characterized by 2 distinct seasons. The dry season, which occurs from November to April, is marked by daily blue skies and clear starry nights and the wet season for the rest of the year with high rainfall intensities accompanied by storms and typhoons.

History
The present-day town of San Juan was once inhabited by Tinguians, belonging to the Inlaud Tribe. Before the Spanish colonial era, the natives were believed to have traded with the Indo-Chinese. They were believed to have bartered with them as evidenced by the presence of antique jars, big bowls, gongs, arrows and shields, beads, jewel and gems.

During the Spanish colonial era, a church was established and many of the people got baptized as Christians. The Spanish named the place San Juan.

From 1907 to 1929, San Juan was a barrio of Dolores. By virtue of a Philippine Legislature bill sponsored by Abra's then-Representative Quintín Paredes and through the initiative of Dolores's then-Vice Mayor Manuel Magala, San Juan became a separate municipality. The new municipality was inaugurated on February 28, 1929.

In the early hours of March 16, 1988, around 120 members of the New People's Army raided and burned down the town's municipal hall, though after four hours of fighting the responding government troopers were able to retake the establishment.

Geography

According to the Philippine Statistics Authority, the municipality has a land area of  constituting  of the  total area of Abra.

Barangays
San Juan is politically subdivided into 19 barangays. These barangays are headed by elected officials: Barangay Captain, Barangay Council, whose members are called Barangay Councilors. All are elected every three years.

Climate

Demographics

In the 2020 census, San Juan had a population of 10,688.

Economy 

San Juan is an agricultural town. Its major products are rice, corn and tobacco. The town has two major rivers: the Malanas River and Tineg River. These two rivers supply the townspeople with fish and they are also used to transport bamboo which is sold to resort owners in Vigan.

During the dry season, the townsfolk also plant string beans, eggplant, peanuts, bitter gourds, squashes, okra and tomatoes. Some also cultivate mangoes.

Government
San Juan, belonging to the lone congressional district of the province of Abra, is governed by a mayor designated as its local chief executive and by a municipal council as its legislative body in accordance with the Local Government Code. The mayor, vice mayor, and the councilors are elected directly by the people through an election which is being held every three years.

Elected officials

References

External links

 [ Philippine Standard Geographic Code]

Municipalities of Abra (province)